Farzanegan Schools are girls-only schools located in the cities of Iran, administered under the National Organization for Development of Exceptional Talents. The schools, which include middle school and high school, are part of gifted and talented schools in Iran. Each year, the schools have entrance examinations that help recognize talented students. Students study subjects in depth like college courses.

NODET
"NODET" stands for National Organization for Development of Extraordinary Talents (SAMPAD in Persian). It used to be a separate organization funded by the government, designed for outstanding students around the country. In 2009, it was combined with the Ministry of Education and therefore weakened substantially. It is a chain of schools which are located in the center of most provinces in two levels: high school and guidance school.

Sampad has had some notable alumni including people like Maryam Mirzakhani, Iman Eftekhari, Reza Amirkhani, Elshan Moradi, and Roozbeh Pournader. Many of students from SAMPAD enter Iranian universities such as Sharif University of Technology and Tehran University. Many pursue higher education in universities around the world. High standards and research-based education makes NODET schools very popular around the country; every year thousands of gifted students participate in an initiation test in order to gain entrance to these schools.

Farzanegan Schools in Tehran
Tehran enjoys a number of Farzaneghan Schools for girls. Among them, Farzaneghan 1 and 6 have a reputation for quality teaching and research. 

NODET Farzaneghan Schools for girls in Tehran

See also
:Category:Tehran Farzanegan School alumni
 Gifted education
 Tehran's Allame Helli 3 High School

Girls' schools in Iran
Gifted education
Schools in Tehran
National Organization for Development of Exceptional Talents
Tehran Farzanegan School alumni